Philippe Valois (27 March 1907 – 28 August 1986) was a Liberal party member of the House of Commons of Canada. He was a lawyer by career.

Born in Lachute, Quebec, Valois was educated at the Seminaire de Joliette and the Université de Montréal, attained Bachelor of Arts and Bachelor of Laws degrees.

He was first elected at the Argenteuil—Deux-Montagnes riding in the 1949 general election then re-elected there for successive terms in 1949, 1953, and 1957. After completing his final federal term, the 23rd Canadian Parliament, Valois did not seek further re-election.

References

External links
 

1907 births
1986 deaths
Members of the House of Commons of Canada from Quebec
Liberal Party of Canada MPs
People from Lachute
Lawyers in Quebec
Université de Montréal alumni